The following table shows the tallest buildings in Ecuador.

References

Tallest
Ecuador

Ecuador